Ivankovo may refer to:
Ivankovo, Croatia, a municipality in Vukovar-Syrmia County of Slavonia, Croatia
Ivankovo, Russia, name of several rural localities in Russia
Ivankovo Reservoir, a reservoir on the Volga River, Russia